Adamiec is a Polish surname. Notable people with the surname include:

Adam Adamiec, Nobody Sleeps in the Woods Tonight Part 2 character 
 (born 1995), Polish boxer
Janusz Adamiec (born 1962), Polish ice hockey player
Józef Adamiec (born 1954), Polish football defender
Tomasz Adamiec (born 1982), Polish judoka
Zenek Adamiec, Nie ma mocnych character 

Polish-language surnames
Surnames of Polish origin